Daddy's Boys is a 1988 American film. The film was directed by Joseph Minion, and the screenplay was written by Daryl Haney.

Cast
Daryl Haney as Jimmy
Laura Burkett as Christie
Raymond J Barry as Daddy
Dan Shor as Hawk
Christian Clemenson as Otis
Ellen Gerstein as Henrietta; Madame Wang
Robert V Barron as Axelrod
Paul Linke as Traveling Salesman
John Voldstad as Motorist
Hinton Battle as Piano Player
Jessica Nelson as Waitress
Jonathan Emerson as Receptionist

Production
Roger Corman later wrote in his memoirs he was feeling frustrated by spending too much of his time on bookkeeping and contracts. He was nostalgic for the days when he would make films over a very short period of time using standing sets from other movies, such as The Terror and Little Shop of Horrors. He was filming Big Bad Mama II and decided to finance a film using that film's sets. He wanted to do a gangster film called Mama's Boys and offered it to Joseph Minion who had written After Hours. Minion's fee was only $5,000, but Corman guaranteed he would be filming within ten days.

Mignon wrote the script with Daryl Haney who also starred. They turned the film into a male story, and renamed it Daddy's Boys. Corman estimated the budget at $300,000 and said it made a small profit after being released theatrically in Europe and on video in the US.

References

External links
Daddy's Boys at Letterbox DVD
Daddy's Boys at IMDb
Daddy's Boys at BFI
Daddy's Boys at TCMDB

1988 films
Films with screenplays by Daryl Haney
1988 drama films